Timur Renatovich Timerzyanov (born 31 January 1987) is a Russian rallycross driver, currently competing in the FIA World Rallycross Championship. He has won the European Rallycross Division 1A Championship in 2010 with SET Promotion and the European Rallycross Division Supercar Championship in 2012 and 2013 with Hansen Motorsport.

He won the first World RX event in 2019. His team GRX also claimed the first victory.

Racing record

Complete FIA European Rallycross Championship results
(key)

Division 1A

Supercar

Complete Global RallyCross Championship results
(key)

Supercar

Complete FIA World Rallycross Championship results
(key)

Supercar

References

External links

 Timur Timerzyanov's profile at fiaworldrallycross.com 
 Timur Timerzyanov's profile at fiaresultsandstatistics.motorsportstats.com

1987 births
Living people
Russian racing drivers
European Rallycross Championship drivers
World Rallycross Championship drivers
Global RallyCross Championship drivers
Russian Circuit Racing Series drivers
Sportspeople from Kazan
Peugeot Sport drivers